The Conway Reef Plate is a small tectonic plate (microplate) located in the south Pacific west of Fiji. It is bounded on the east and west by convergent boundaries, the western boundary is with the New Hebrides Plate while the eastern is with the Australian Plate. A short transform boundary also exists with the Balmoral Reef Plate.

References
 Bird, P. (2003) An updated digital model of plate boundaries, Geochemistry, Geophysics, Geosystems, 4(3), 1027, . 

Tectonic plates
Geology of the Pacific Ocean